La Vampire Nue (English: The Nude Vampire,   The Naked Vampire) is a 1970 film directed by Jean Rollin. It concerns a suicide cult led by a mysterious man known as "The Master".

Plot
In a strange laboratory, three men in weird masks take the blood of a naked young woman in a hood. Another woman in an orange nightgown is wandering the streets and is followed by a group of people also wearing weird masks. The woman comes across a man named Pierre who tries to help her, but the masked men corner them and shoot the woman; Pierre escapes unharmed. The masked men take the woman into a building, and Pierre follows. Guests then arrive for some sort of party, but Pierre can't get into the building. Another scene reveals his father is behind it.

He gatecrashes the next party, and a woman commits suicide in front of the other guests when a man shows her picture up on a projector. The woman in the orange nightgown appears and drinks the woman's blood. Pierre's face then appears on the projector. The other guests turn on Pierre. He escapes and is stopped by a man in a white cape who tells him to go to his father's office, where more mysteries await him.

Pierre goes to his father's office and confronts him, who explains that the girl he saw is his protégée and an orphan. Pierre's father was a  friend of her family. The girl has an unknown blood condition, and her wounds heal right away; she is also believed to be a goddess by certain fanatics.  What the father is saying is that she is a vampire. People are working to find someone with the same condition so that they can find a cure. The hoods and masks hide human faces from her so that she does not know she is different. They are hiding her from a group of vampires.

The vampire in the white cape takes the woman and tells Pierre to protect her. A fight then occurs between the vampires and the humans, leading to a beach where the woman sees the sunlight for the first time. They explain that they are not vampires but mutants and that the human race will one day evolve and all have the power of immortality.

Cast
 Caroline Cartier as Vampire (credited as Christine François)
 Olivier Rollin as Pierre Radamante (credited as Olivier Martin)
 Maurice Lemaitre as Georges Radamante
 Bernard Musson as Voringe
 Jean Aron as Fredor
 Ursule Pauly as Solange
 Catherine Castel as Georges' Servant (credited as Cathy Tricot)
 Marie-Pierre Castel as Georges Servant (credited as Pony Tricot)
 Michel Delahaye as Grandmaster
 Ly Lestrong
 Pascal Fardoulis as Robert
 Paul Bisciglia as Butler
 René-Jean Chauffard

Release
La Vampire Nue was distributed in France by Les Distributeurs Associés on 20 May 1970. It is available on Blu-ray from Kino and streaming on their Kino Cult platform.

Reception
David McGillivray of the Monthly Film Bulletin reviewed a 79-minute dubbed version of the film. McGillivray described the film as a "disconcerting mixture of traditional horror and furturistic sci-fi effects-achieves at its best a quality that is more hallucinatory than erotic." McGillivray found that the set, costume designs and sequences at the baroque chateau have "a certain bizarre extravagance, but the essential thinness of the script is reinforced by Rollin's tendency to strive for a sustained mood of mystery by holding shots for several seconds after the action has been completed." McGillivray concluded that the "cumulative effect of these delays a deadendingly slow pace which appears more contrived than supernatural."

References

External links
 

1970 films
1970 horror films
Films directed by Jean Rollin
French vampire films
1970 LGBT-related films
1970s French films